Ka Kha Ga Gha (Bengali: ক খ গ ঘ) is an Indian Bengali-language comedy film written and directed by Dr. Krishnendu Chatterjee and produced by Dr. Krishna Mukhopadhyay under the banner of Krishna Movies. Ka Kha Ga Gha is all about four young men Kalyan, an aspiring director, Kharaj, a script writer, Ganesh, an aspiring actor, and Ghanta, the antagonist in the team living in a dormitory. Samadarshi, Sourav, and Sayan played the lead roles in this venture. Actress Sayani Ghosh is seen essaying the leading lady opposite Sourav. Paran Bandyopadhyay roped in to play the mess owner. Kaushik Ganguly and Aparajita Adhya has played pivotal roles in this film.

Cast 

 Samadarshi Dutta as Kalyan
 Iman Chakraborty as Kharaj
 Saurav Das as Ganesh
 Rj Sayan as Ghanta
 Kaushik Ganguly as Bhabotosh Sikhdar
 Paran Bandopadhyay
 Mir Afsar Ali
 Aparajita Addhya
 Saayoni Ghosh
 Lama Halder
 Manashi Sinha

Production 
In earlier 2017, director Dr. Krishnendu Chatterjee penned the script. The film was titled Ka Kha Ga Gha. The shooting was completed in a month's time.

Marketing 
The first teaser was released on 20 January 2018.

The film's official poster was launched at the Level Seven Rooftop Lounge.

The trailer of the film was released on February 19, 2018, in Bengali language.

The film was released on March 9, 2018, at Nandan. The film has scored a five in a row houseful at Nandan even after getting mixed feedback from leading newspapers and media.

Rii Sen is seen sizzling in ‘Ka Kha Ga Gha’ dance number ‘Kuchur Muchur’ recently.

Soundtrack 

Anindya Chatterjee has composed the songs of the film. The song "Naam Na Jana Pakhi" became popular.

Track listing

References

External links 

2018 films
Bengali-language Indian films
Indian children's comedy films
2010s children's comedy films
2010s Bengali-language films